The Northern Colorado Bears football program is a college football team that represents University of Northern Colorado in the Big Sky Conference, a part of the NCAA Division I Football Championship.  The team has had 17 head coaches since its first recorded football game in 1892. The position has been vacant since November 21, 2022, when Ed McCaffrey was fired.

Key

Coaches
Statistics correct as of the end of the 2021 college football season.

Notes

References

Lists of college football head coaches

Colorado sports-related lists